The Museum of Classic Chicago Television (also known as FuzzyMemoriesTV) is an online museum dedicated to the preservation of Chicago television broadcasts.  Most of the museum's footage originates from "airchecks" of local Chicago channels (and to a lesser extent other cities) that were recorded primarily in the 1970s and 1980s.  The registered 501(c)(3) nonprofit corporation displays on its website more than 4000 clips of commercials, news broadcasts, PSAs, bumpers, obscure specials, moments of technical difficulties and other off-air recording excerpts, as well as occasional master tapes donated by former television employees. 

On March 17, 2011, the museum announced that it had discovered lost footage of Garfield Goose and Friends, which was previewed on its website.

On September 15, 2011, the museum announced that it had discovered and transferred long-lost footage of the original Svengoolie program; it subsequently displayed the missing episodes on its website the following Monday.

On November 27, 2012, WGN-TV announced that it would air a 1971 tape of Bozo's Circus that was recovered with the help of the museum on that year's Christmas Day. WGN has had a mixed relationship with the museum, initially trying to prevent the museum from posting Bozo content; it later dropped most of its objections out of respect for the museum's work preserving the content.

In 2013 the site uploaded "Fahey Flynn Presents Seven's Greetings," a one-hour special that aired once in 1972.

In 2018 the site unearthed a rare color kinescope of a 1971 newscast on WLS-Channel 7, featuring Fahey Flynn, Joel Daly and meteorologist John Coleman.

On April 26, 2022 the museum announced it will be premiering a long-lost episode of 'BJ's Bunch', a Bill Jackson created show done at WNBC in 1973 that was discovered in the Peabody archives.

References

External links
 
 

Virtual museums
Charities based in Illinois
Non-profit organizations based in Chicago
Museums in Chicago
Internet properties established in 2007
History of Chicago
Mass media in Chicago
Television archives in the United States
Television_preservation
History of television in the United States
History of broadcasting
Audiovisual ephemera
Online archives of the United States